Pleurococcus is a genus of green algae in the family Chaetophoraceae that are spherical in shape with a thick cell wall to protect themselves against excessive water loss.

They can be found alone or in bunches together forming a slimy layer and grow on moist, dark patches of trees, rocks and soil.

Species
The genus consists of the following species:

 Pleurococcus angulosus
 Pleurococcus magnum
 Pleurococcus mucosus
 Pleurococcus rufescens
 Pleurococcus vulgaris

References

External links
 

Chaetophorales genera
Chaetophoraceae